Amena Begum (1925 – 7 April 1989), a former Member of Parliament of East Pakistan, was a Bangladeshi politician. She was instrumental in campaigning all over East Pakistan for the Six Point program of regional autonomy drafted by the Awami League, and on June 7, 1966, organized the general strike along with Mizanur Rahman Chowdhury. This strike was observed throughout the then East Pakistan and was the first major indication that an independent Bangladesh was imminent. She later took over as president of the Jatiya League. She died in Dhaka on 7 April 1989.

Education and early career

Begum passed Matriculation and Intermediate examination from Nawab Faizunnesa Girls' School in 1940 and Eden Girls' College in 1942 respectively. She joined East Pakistan Awami Muslim League in 1950. She was elected a member of the East Bengal Legislative Assembly in 1954 as a United Front candidate in the reserve seats for women in Comilla-Sylhet constituency. Begum was elected as secretary of women affairs in central executive committee of Awami League in 1966 which office she held till 1970.

At the initial stage of the six-point program in 1966, when the top ranking leaders of Awami League including its president Sheikh Mujibur Rahman and general secretary Tajuddin Ahmed were arrested, Begum was made the acting general secretary of the party on 27 July 1966. Begum had a pivotal role in helming the affairs of the party in that critical period of repression of the autocratic Ayub government upon the activists of the party throughout the country. She played an important role in organizing the Six-point Movement and maintaining liaison with the Awami League activists working to that end. She contributed a lot to the floating of eleven points Movement of the students in October 1968 and in organizing the anti-Ayub mass upsurge in 1969.

Begum was serious in asserting her subsequent position in Awami League, and in the following convention (1970) claimed the portfolio of general secretary of the party. Her expectation being denied, Begum resigned from Awami League and later joined the newly floated (1969) Jatiya League headed by Ataur Rahman Khan. She was elected as senior vice president of Jatiya League on 20 August 1970. Begum contested in the Pakistan National Assembly election in 1970 from Dhaka-9 constituency as a nominee of Jatiya League only to sustain a reverse.

Post-independence

With the revival of Jatiya League in 1976 under the Political Parties Regulations of the martial law government, Begum became active in politics as senior vice president of the party. She took part in the movement against the military rule of Hussain Muhammad Ershad with her party as a member of the seven-party alliance. After the party president Ataur Rahman Khan joined the cabinet of General Ershad as Prime Minister in 1984, Begum re-organised Jatiya League and took over as president of the party.

References 

1925 births
1989 deaths
20th-century Bangladeshi women politicians
People from Chandpur District
Awami League politicians
Eden Mohila College alumni